The red-headed weaver (Anaplectes rubriceps) is a species of bird in the family Ploceidae. It is placed in the monotypic genus Anaplectes and is found throughout the Afrotropics.

Races
There are two races, though some 13 have been suggested. They differ by the colour of the belly, colour of the edges to the primaries, and the presence or absence of a black mask.
 A. r. leuconotos (J. W. von Müller, 1851) – West Africa to northern Malawi
 A. r. rubriceps (Sundevall, 1850) – Southern Africa
A. r. gurneyi from Caconda, Angola, a synonym of the above

Gallery

Notes

References

External links 
 Red-headed weaver -  Species text in Weaver Watch.
 Red-headed weaver - Species text in The Atlas of Southern African Birds.
 Image and Classification at Animal Diversity Web

red-headed weaver
Birds of Sub-Saharan Africa
red-headed weaver
Birds of East Africa
Taxonomy articles created by Polbot